Teulisna perdentata is a moth of the family Erebidae first described by Herbert Druce in 1899. It is found in south-western China and Malacca.

Taxonomy
It was formerly listed as a synonym of Teulisna nebulosa.

References

Moths described in 1899
perdentata